Jocelyn de Brakelond or Jocelin de Brakelonde (fl. latter half of 12th century) was an English monk and the author of a chronicle narrating the fortunes of the monastery of Bury St. Edmunds Abbey between 1173 and 1202. He is only known through his own work.

Joceylyn was a native of Bury St. Edmunds; he served his novitiate under Samson of Tottington, who was at that time master of the novices, but afterwards sub-sacrist, and, from 1182, abbot of the house. Jocelyn took the habit of religion in 1173, during the time of Abbot Hugo (1157–1180), through whose improvidence and laxity the abbey had become impoverished and the monks had lost discipline.

The fortunes of the abbey changed for the better with the election of Samson as Hugo's successor. Jocelyn, who became the abbot's chaplain within four months of the election, describes the administration of Samson at considerable length. He tells us that he was with Samson night and day for six years; the picture which he gives of his master, although coloured by enthusiastic admiration, is singularly frank and intimate. It is all the more convincing since Jocelyn is no stylist. His Latin is familiar and easy, but the reverse of classical. He thinks and writes as one whose interests are wrapped up in his house; and the unique interest of his work lies in the minuteness with which it describes the policy of a monastic administrator who was in his own day considered as a model.

Jocelyn has also been credited with an extant but unprinted tract on the election of Abbot Hugo (Harleian manuscript 1005, fol. 165); from internal evidence this appears to be an error. He mentions a (non-extant) work which he wrote, before the Cronica, on the miracles of Saint Robert of Bury, a boy found murdered in 1181 whose death during a period of rising anti-Semitism was blamed on the local Jews.

J. G. Rokewood published an edition of Chronica Jocelini de Brakelonda de Rebus Gestis Samsonis Abbatis Monasterii Sancti Edmundi (Camden Society), in 1840. A translation and notes are given in TE Tomlin's Monastic and Social Life in the Twelfth Century in the Chronicle of Jocelyn de Brakelond (1844). Thomas Carlyle's book Past and Present, which contrasted medieval and modern culture, used Tomlin's edition of Jocelyn as its principal source,  making a hero of Abbot Samson, one of the main figures in Jocelyn's narrative.

A recent translation with a substantial introduction is: Jocelin of Brakelond, Chronicle of the Abbey of Bury St Edmunds, trans. Diana Greenway and Jane Sayers (Oxford: Oxford Univ. Press, 1989; reissue 2009).

Notes

References
Jocelyn de Brakelond, Chronicle of the Abbey of Bury St. Edmunds 1202, Oxford World Classics.
Jocelin Brakelond, The Chronicle of Jocelin Brakelond: A Picture of Monastic Life in the Days of Abbott Samson, newly edited by Sir Ernest Clarke, M.A. F.S.A; London: Alexander Moring, The De La More Press, 1903

External links
 
 

12th-century births
Year of birth unknown
13th-century English historians
1211 deaths
English Christian monks
English chroniclers
Writers from Bury St Edmunds
Benedictine scholars
Benedictine writers
12th-century English historians
12th-century Latin writers